Geet Chaturvedi (born 27 November 1977) is a Hindi poet, short story author, lyricist, screenwriter  and novelist. Often regarded as an avant-garde writer, he was awarded the Bharat Bhushan Agrawal Award for poetry in 2007  and Krishna Pratap Award for Fiction in 2014. He lives in Bhopal, India. He is active both as a fiction writer and critic. In 2011, The Indian Express included him in a list of the 'Ten Best Writers' of India. His poems have been translated into 22 languages worldwide. He translated the work of great Spanish Poet Pablo Neruda in Hindi and many others.

Chaturvedi is the author of eleven books including the poetry collections Aalaap me girah in 2010, Nyoonatam Main in 2017, and Khushiyon Ke Guptchar in 2019. He also published two collections of novellas, Savant Anti Ki Ladkiyan and Pink Slip Daddy, in 2010. The novella "Pink Slip Daddy" was considered to be one of the best works of fiction in contemporary Hindi writing by the literary periodical Kathadesh.  The English translation of his novella "Simsim", translated by Anita Gopalan, won the PEN/Heim Translation Fund Grants, 2016.

Geet Chaturvedi is considered one of the most widely read contemporary Hindi literary authors. His poetry is immensely popular among general readers and it has won high acclaim from literary critics as well. Adhuri Cheezon ka Devta is his latest book of non-fiction.

Poetry
Geet Chaturvedi was awarded the Bharat Bhushan Agrawal Award in 2007. His poetry has been translated into 22 languages. In Anita Gopalan's English translation, his poems have been published in AGNI, PEN America, Poetry International, Sycamore Review, World Literature Today, Words without Borders, Asymptote (magazine), Chicago Review, The Offing, Modern Poetry in Translation, and elsewhere.

The Amphibian

His long poem Ubhaychar (The amphibian) was published in 2010, and treats topics such as memory and collective myths.

Aalaap mein girah

Aalaap mein girah (Lit. Nodule in Prelude) is the first volume of his poems, published in 2010 with positive reviews. It established Chaturvedi as the leading poet of his generation.

Nyoonatam Main

Nyoonatam Main (Lit. The Minimal I) is the second volume of his poems, published in 2017. It was named among the best books of Hindi poetry by many literary critics along publications like Femina, Navbharat Times etc. It was included in the Dainik Jagran Bestseller list 2017–2018. Nyoonatam Main won the prestigious Spandan Award for Hindi poetry.

Khushiyon Ke Guptchar

Khushiyon Ke Guptchar (Lit. Secret Agents of Joys) is the third book of Chaturvedi's poems. It became an instant bestseller after its publication. The books has 81 poems of his, written during 2014 to 2017.

Fiction

Aunt Savant And Her Daughters

Savant Anti Ki Ladkiyan (lit. Aunt Savant And Her Daughters), his first book of fiction, contains three novellas set in Mumbai. The common theme of the stories is women obsessed with the idea of love.

Pink Slip Daddy

Pink Slip Daddy, published in 2010, is also a collection of three novellas, "Gomutra", "Simsim", and "Pink Slip Daddy". "Gomutra" is a critique of the open market economy, in which the protagonist gets into increasingly large debts, ending with his death. "Simsim" is a love story set in a decaying library; the English translation by Anita Gopalan was awarded with the PEN/Heim Translation Fund Grants in 2016. The title story is about a man called Prafful Shashikant Dadhich or PSD, nicknamed "Pink Slip Daddy".

The book received the Krishna Prataap Award for Fiction 2014. The award statement mentioned Chaturvedi's "mastery as a storyteller", and his "taut poetic language".

Praise

Many senior writers and literary journals consider him one of the best writers in India. Veteran critic Namvar Singh has named him as one of the best poets and novelists of the first decade of the 21st century.

While poet-critic Ashok Vajpeyi, in an interview, says, "Geet Chaturvedi has shown a truly avant-garde spirit in his fiction and poetry. He brings his vast reading, unusual for his generation, to bear effortlessly on his writing, which is innovative in language and style. He has an evolving vision, which is not bogged down by cliches or clutches of current ideological stances."

Iraqi-American poet Dunya Mikhail said, 'Like any good poet, Geet Chaturvedi has a third eye with which he uses cinematic techniques in creating scenes that are wild, innocent, and playful. His subtle style and sensibilities make these poems pure joy to read.' 

In an article written for Poetry International, Indian English language poet Arundhathi Subramaniam praised his poetry and said, 'Informed by his reading of world poetry, postmodern European literature and the Sanskrit-Pali traditions of Indian letters, Geet Chaturvedi's poetry is obviously intertextual.'

Translation

Among the poets he has translated into Hindi, Sabeer Haka, Adam Zagajewski, Bei Dao, Dunya Mikhail, Iman Mersal, Eduardo Chirinos, Adunis, Mahmoud Darwish, Pablo Neruda, Federico Garcia Lorca are to name a few.

Selected bibliography

Poetry
 2019: 
 2017: 
 2010:

Fiction
 2010: 
 2010:

Non-fiction
 2021: 
 2018: 
 2004:

Translated by Geet Chaturvedi
 2018: Khud se Kai Sawal, by Amit Dutta, Rajkamal Prakashan, New Delhi. . 
 2004: Chile Ke Jungalon se, Prose by Pablo Neruda, Samvad Prakashan

Editing
 2018: Lekhak Ka Cinema, Writings on world cinema by Kunwar Narayan, edited by Geet Chaturvedi, Rajkamal Prakashan, New Delhi. .

Geet Chaturvedi in translation
 2019: The Memory of Now, translated by Anita Gopalan, Anomalous Press, Rhode Islands, USA. .
 2019: Simsim, Marathi translation by Jui Kulkarni, Book Hungama, Pune
 2021: Chitta Phool Je Gulabi Hona Chahunda, Essays on literature in Punjabi translation, translated by Gaurav, Autumn Art Publishers, Patiala, Punjab. .

Awards and honors
Chaturvedi has won several awards and recognitions for his writings.
 2007: Bharat Bhushan award for poetry 
 2011: One of the ten best writers of India, Indian Express 
 2014: Krishna Pratap Katha Samman for fiction for Pink Slip Daddy
 2016: PEN/Heim Translation Fund Grants for Simsim to his translator Anita Gopalan
 2018: Shailesh Matiyani Katha Samman for fiction for Pink Slip Daddy 
 2019: Krishna Baldev Vaid fellowship for fiction 
 2019: Syed Haider Raza fellowship for fiction  
 2020: Vagdhara Navratna Samman for poetry for Nyoonatam Main
 2020: Spandan Kriti Samman for poetry for Nyoonatam Main
 2021: Vatayan International Literature Award for his contribution to Hindi literature (United Kingdom)

Other recognition
 During 2017–2018, Nyoonatam Main was regularly listed in the Dainik Jagran Bestselling Books. It was listed in the Best Books of the Year lists by many publications including Navbharat Times, Dainik Jagran, Nai Duniya and Femina Magazine.
 Khushiyon Ke Guptchar was listed into the top five Hindi poetry books of the year in 2019-2020 by the leading newspaper Navbharat Times.

References

External links
 
Simsim by Geet Chaturvedi: PEN America
 Two poems by Geet Chaturvedi: World Literature Today
 Anita Gopalan's essay on translating Geet Chaturvedi
 Geet Chaturvedi's poem: Modern Poetry in Translation
 Geet Chaturvedi's poems: Poetry International Rotterdam, Translated by Anita Gopalan
 Geet Chaturvedi's blog in Hindi
 Geet Chaturvedi's poems in Hindi at Kavitakosh
 Geet Chaturvedi's Interview and two poems (English): Muse India
 Geet Chaturvedi's poems at Circumference: Poetry In Translation
 Excerpt from The Amphibian in the Columbia Journal
 Geet Chaturvedi's poems in Spanish translation in Mexican journal Luvina

Indian male novelists
Indian male short story writers
Indian male poets
Hindi-language poets
1977 births
21st-century Indian translators
Living people
Writers from Mumbai
Hindi-language writers
Poets from Maharashtra
21st-century Indian poets
21st-century Indian novelists
21st-century Indian short story writers
21st-century Indian male writers
Novelists from Maharashtra